Marcus Junius Parrott (October 27, 1828 – October 4, 1879) was a delegate to Congress from the Kansas Territory from 1857 until 1861.

Biography
Parrott was born in Hamburg, South Carolina, on October 27, 1828.  He attended the local schools, and was an 1849 graduate of Dickinson College in Carlisle, Pennsylvania.  He studied at Harvard Law School in 1850 and 1851, was admitted to the Ohio bar, and settled in Dayton.  He served in the Ohio House of Representatives as a Democrat in 1853 and 1854, and then moved to Leavenworth, Kansas.

In 1855, Parrott was appointed reporter of decisions for the first session of the Kansas Territory's Supreme Court.  In October 1855, Parrott was elected to serve as a delegate to the territory's 1856 constitutional convention in Topeka.  He was defense counsel for Governor Charles L. Robinson was impeached as part of a political rivalry with Jim Lane, and won an acquittal.  In 1856, he was elected as a Republican to serve as the territory's non-voting delegate to Congress.  In 1857, he was a delegate to the territorial constitutional convention. He was reelected to Congress in 1858, and served in the 35th and 36th Congresses (March 4, 1857 to January 29, 1861).

Parrott's term ended when Kansas was admitted to the Union, and he was an unsuccessful candidate for election to one Kansas' two seats in the United States Senate; he lost a close race to Lane and Samuel C. Pomeroy. After leaving Congress, Parrott practiced law and farmed in Leavenworth. He ran unsuccessfully for the US House of Representatives as an Independent in 1862, and as a Democrat in 1872.

Parrott returned to Dayton to live with his brother when his health began to fail in the late 1870s.  He died in Dayton on October 4, 1879, and was buried at Woodland Cemetery in Dayton.

References

Sources

Books

External links

Marcus Junius Parrott at The Political Graveyard
Biography of Marcus Junius Parrott at Dickinson College Archives & Special Collections

1828 births
1879 deaths
19th-century American lawyers
19th-century American politicians
Burials in Ohio
Delegates to the United States House of Representatives from Kansas Territory
Dickinson College alumni
Kansas Democrats
Kansas lawyers
Kansas Republicans
Members of the Ohio House of Representatives
Ohio lawyers
People from Hamburg, South Carolina
Politicians from Leavenworth, Kansas
Politicians from Dayton, Ohio